The Public-Private Alliance Foundation (PPAF), a non-profit organization based in New York, works with collaborators to support teaching and fieldwork opportunities on solar cooking and bio-digesters for biogas and garden fertilizer in Haiti. The Public Private Alliance Foundation (PPAF) promotes the United Nations Sustainable Development Goals and uses a business approach for poverty alleviation while focusing on renewable energy, public health, and entrepreneurship; this is achieved through projects and seminars involving multi-stakeholder cooperation with both USA and Haitian based organizations. As a special focus, PPAF builds evidence to increase the impact of innovations for clean cooking in Haiti. Most families in Haiti depend on charcoal for daily cooking, leading to respiratory disease and massive deforestation. PPAF and collaborating organizations conduct research & introduce development activities to improve the lives and livelihoods of all, especially for women and girls, through solar, biogas and ethanol fuel and cookstoves and related small business. The aim is to help families escape the poverty-respiratory disease-deforestation trap, by reducing the heavy dependence on charcoal for daily cooking.

Operations Overview

The Public-Private Alliance Foundation is a not-for-profit 501(c)3 donor-supported corporation headquartered in New York. Established with support from United Nations ambassadors from Madagascar, the Dominican Republic and Haiti, PPAF has conducted various development activities in each of these countries and convenes seminars at the United Nations and elsewhere to bring attention to energy and climate change, sustainable development, and gender and public health issues. PPAF conducts research, acts as a voice for clean cooking and women’s empowerment, and takes steps toward the commercialization of low-cost cookstoves, especially those fueled by biogas and solar power.  Support to PPAF comes from international organizations, individuals, community groups and businesses.

In keeping with its name, PPAF creates alliances and collaborates with other organizations to implement, monitor and advocate for affordable non-polluting cookstoves and fuels, growing from or advancing their separate efforts.  Organizations include a Haitian university, several solar non-profits, a biogas non-profit, an institute for youth training and entrepreneurship, and a network of clubs established to empower low-income adolescent girls. The efforts engage local groups, document innovations, assess challenges and successes, publicize results and promote expansion.  Beyond this, PPAF participates in the Global Alliance for Clean Cookstoves deliberations for an action plan to transform the cookstoves and fuels market in Haiti.

Seminars Convened 
PPAF has convened seminars at United Nations Headquarters and elsewhere since its establishment in 2007.  In recent years, these include sessions with the United Nations Association – Southern New York State Division during the UN Commission on the Status of Women (CSW) to address “Innovative Programs in Haiti: Education, Agriculture, Clean Cooking and Women’s Solidarity” (63rd session), “Clean Cooking for Sustainable Development” (62nd session) and “Girls, Women, Clean Energy and Entrepreneurship, in Haiti and Elsewhere” (61st session).

Communications 
PPAF engages its network and the public through its website, its newsletter, (with copies also filed on its website), social media including Facebook, Twitter and LinkedIn, and through the convening of seminars. In September 2017, PPAF was featured in the Solar Cookers International newsletter, and in December 2016, PPAF was the “Partner Spotlight” in the Global Alliance for Clean Cookstoves newsletter.  See below for the links.

Leadership 
PPAF is led by a volunteer board that includes the Executive Director, a 30-year career officer with the United Nations.  It relies on volunteers and collaborators in other organizations for most of its work. All board members have had extensive international experience and speak several languages. They include an attorney working in international trade finance transactions; the former Ambassador from Madagascar to the United Nations; a nutrition and food science practitioner with an MBA and extensive experience with multinational corporations and with training women and girls in entrepreneurship; an international evaluation and thematic expert in gender, health and economic empowerment with a PhD in International Public Health; a public health specialist and former career officer with United States Agency for International Development (USAID) and the State Department; and a consultant in international public health with experience in non-governmental organizations, universities and international organizations. PPAF relies on its Senior Fellows, interns (over 60 in the past ten years, from many countries, cultures and ethnicities) and volunteers in its work. Board members, Senior Fellows and volunteers are selected according to their special technical or experiential backgrounds, as needed.  See the About Us section of the PPAF website.

Associations 
PPAF has consultative status with the UN Economic & Social Council, is associated with the UN Department of Global Communications, and is a member of the UN Global Compact, the Clean Cooking Alliance, and the UN Association of the USA and its Council of Organizations. It participates in two technical associations, namely Solar Cookers International and Solar CITIES Global Biogas Education. As seen on its website, PPAF has a GuideStar gold seal for 2019, has been top rated by Great Non-Profits for many years, and has published its latest commitment of engagement to the UN Global Compact.

References

External links
 Public Private Alliance Foundation website
 PPAF Blog - Partnerships for Sustainable Development

Development charities based in the United States